Moscow Polytechnic University or Moscow Polytech is a university in Moscow, Russia. It specializes in the field of automobile and tractor design. It was founded in 1866 as Komissarov Technical School.

From 2012 to 2016, its name was Moscow State University of Mechanical Engineering (MAMI), where MAMI stood for Moscow Automechanical Institute.

Design projects

 Fortis (aerojeep), in collaboration with Zhukovsky Aerodynamics Research Institute

References

External links
Official website in Russian

Universities in Moscow
Educational institutions established in 1866
1866 establishments in the Russian Empire
Technical universities and colleges in Russia